Molly Scott (born 30 March 1999) is an Irish track and field athlete. She is a twice Irish 60m national champion as well as the national record holder over that distance. She has been called “Ireland's fastest woman”.

Personal life
Molly Scott is from Carlow in south-east Ireland. She is a member of St. Laurence O'Toole Athletics Club in Carlow. Scott, since the age of 12, has been coached by her mother Deirdre. In 2021, she completed a law degree and subsequently began a barrister of law degree at King's Inns.

Career

Junior career
Scott won bronze in the 100 metres hurdles at the 2016 European Athletics Youth Championships held in Tbilisi, Georgia. In 2018, she earned silver as part of the 4 × 100 m Irish team at the World U-20 Championships in Tampere, Finland.

Senior career
Scott took her first Irish national senior title in 2019 when she won the 60 m race in a time of 7.32 seconds at the National Sports Campus in Abbotstown.

On 29 January 2022, she broke the national 60 m record held by Amy Foster by running 7.23 seconds for the distance. However, Scott only initially held the record for a few days as Rhasidat Adeleke then ran 7.21 in Albuquerque that same week. On 27 February, Scott regained the national record running 7.19 and in doing so secured the win for her second Irish Indoor Athletics Championships in Abbotstown. It was the second time the final had been run that day after a technical fault had not recorded times for the first race. In February, Scott also recorded a win over 60 m European indoor champion Ajla Del Ponte at the Czech Gala in Ostrava.

Scott was named in the Ireland squad for the 2022 World Athletics Indoor Championships held in the Serbian capital Belgrade in March 2022. She qualified from the heats for the semi-final in the 60 m, before finishing 19th overall. She was named in the Irish sprint relay team for the outdoor 2022 World Athletics Championships held in Eugene, Oregon.

References

External links
 

Living people
1999 births
Irish athletes
Irish female sprinters
21st-century Irish women
People from County Carlow
Sportspeople from County Carlow